Ghazipur Ghat railway station is a small railway station in Ghazipur district, Uttar Pradesh. Its code is GZT. It serves Ghazipur Rural Area. The station consists of 1 platform. The platform is not well sheltered. It lacks many facilities including water and sanitation.

See also 

 Varanasi Junction railway station
 Ghazipur City railway station

References 

Railway stations in Ghazipur district
Ghazipur
Varanasi railway division
Transport in Ghazipur